James Greenacre (1785–1837), the "Edgware Road Murderer", was an English grocer.

Life
He was engaged to be married to Hannah Brown.  They lived in buildings on Edgware Road, London, not far from Hyde Park.  One day in 1837, the police found a woman's head in Regent's Canal.  They identified Hannah's body and suspected her fiancé as a murderer because he hoped to marry her for her money only. He also had a mistress, Sarah Gale, who helped him after the murder. Greenacre and Gale were to emigrate to America the day after they were both arrested. Greenacre was arrested, tried and found guilty at the Old Bailey.  In the trial it was described how Greenacre had meticulously wrapped the head in a handkerchief, before disposing of it, and scattering the limbs elsewhere.

The case generated a huge public interest.  Great crowds gathered at Newgate to see the hanging. The spectacle was accompanied by sales of memorabilia, such as mugs, and flags, and rented rooms.  The executioner, the celebrated William Calcraft, was notorious for a short drop on the rope, meaning his victims took a longer time to die.

References

Bibliography

 Brandon & Brooke, London, the Executioner's city (Sutton, 2006), 74-5, 198.
 Honeycombe, Gordon, More Murders of the Black Museum
 http://www.exclassics.com/newgate/ng622.htm
 http://tarlton.law.utexas.edu/lpop/etext/newgate5/greenacre.htm

1785 births
1837 deaths
English people convicted of murder
People convicted of murder by England and Wales
People executed for murder
Executed English people
19th-century executions by England and Wales
1837 murders in the United Kingdom